Sina Kollmann (born 12 May 2003) is a Liechtensteiner footballer who plays as a defender for Ruggell and the Liechtenstein national football team.

Career statistics

International

References

2003 births
Living people
Women's association football defenders
Liechtenstein women's footballers
Liechtenstein women's international footballers